Gustavo Benítez (born 5 February 1953) is a retired Paraguayan football defender and coach.

Playing career
As a player, Benítez won several national championships with Olimpia Asunción, where he was a key part of the defence.

He also made 42 appearances for the Paraguay national football team, and competed at the 1987 Copa América in Argentina.

Coaching career
After retiring from football as a player he became a coach. At Chilean club Colo-Colo, he won three Chilean league championships (1996, 1997, 1998) and one Copa Chile (1996). 

In January 1999, Benítez replaced the sacked Nando Yosu at the helm of Spanish La Liga club Racing de Santander, and saved the team from relegation. He resigned at the end of the following season, after a second consecutive 15th-place finish caused some dissent from the fans; his Russian striker Vladimir Beschastnykh told his country's Sport Express in January 2000 that he wanted the Cantabrians to lose so that Benítez could be dismissed.

Benítez returned to the Estadio El Sardinero in March 2001 after the dismissal of Gregorio Manzano, for what remained of the season plus two more. However, he lost his job on 5 October after a poor start to the Segunda División campaign following relegation, and was replaced by Quique Setién.

In February 2003, Benítez was back in Spain's top flight, taking over a Rayo Vallecano team placed in 18th. After winning twice in ten games, putting the team into their eventual last position, he was dismissed on 14 April and Antonio Iriondo appointed.

On 1 April 2010 CD Palestino officials hired the former Cobreloa and Colo-Colo coach to replace Jorge Aravena who quit about two weeks ago.

References

External links
Playing statistics at BDFutbol
Managerial statistics at BDFutbol

1953 births
Living people
People from Paraguarí
Paraguayan footballers
Paraguay international footballers
Paraguayan football managers
Atlético Nacional footballers
Club Olimpia footballers
Club Olimpia managers
Colo-Colo managers
Cobreloa managers
Club Deportivo Palestino managers
Expatriate footballers in Spain
Expatriate footballers in Colombia
Expatriate football managers in Chile
Racing de Santander managers
Rayo Vallecano managers
La Liga managers
La Liga players
Granada CF footballers
Paraguayan Primera División players
Categoría Primera A players
1975 Copa América players
1987 Copa América players
Association football defenders